Mohamadou Sissoko (born 8 August 1988) is a French professional footballer who plays as a defender for Ermis Aradippou. He also holds Malian citizenship.

Club career
Sissoko was born in Villeneuve-la-Garenne, Hauts-de-Seine. He signed for Udinese in 2006. In 2007–08 and 2008–09 season he left for Celano and Gallipoli Calcio, but returned to Udinese in mid-season twice. He played at Campionato Nazionale Primavera 2008–09 season as overage player. He made his debut on the professional level in the 2008/09 season in Lega Pro Prima Divisione for Gallipoli Calcio. Sissoko spent the 2009–10 season on loan at Eupen.

Sissoko spent the 2010–11 season on loan at Kilmarnock. On 20 July 2010, he played his first match for Kilmarnock in a 7–1 win against Bideford, a pre-season friendly. Udinese officially announced the loan deal on 12 August. and the Scottish club on 18 August. Shortly joining, Sissoko debut was delayed over international clearance. On 22 August 2010, Sissoko made his debut, making his first start and playing 90 minutes, in a 1–0 loss against Motherwell. Sissoko scored his first goal for Kilmarnock in a 6–2 win over Airdrie United in the second round of the Scottish League Cup. Since joining Kilmarnock, Sissoko says his desire is to stay in Scotland, due to Italian hooligans – as a citing reason to stay in Scotland. On 20 November 2010, Sissoko received a red card – for the first time in his Scottish career – in a 3–2 loss against Rangers.

After being priced out of a permanent move for the player, Kilmarnock were eventually allowed to re-sign Sissoko on another season-long loan deal on transfer deadline day in August 2011. Sissoko scored his first goal in his second loan spell at Kilmarnock in a 2–0 win over East Fife in the quarter finals of the Scottish League Cup. On 18 March, he played in the 2012 Scottish League Cup Final which Kilmarnock won after beating Celtic 1–0.

Sissoko was released by Udinese after the 2011–12 season and signed for Kilmarnock in October 2012.

On 12 September 2013 the Greek superleague side Veria signed Sissoko on a one-year contract.

On 9 August 2016 Sissoko returned to the Greek superleague side Veria.

On 9 August 2017 Sissoko signed to the Israeli Premier League side Hapoel Acre.

After six months with Karabükspor, he moved to Rovaniemen Palloseura in February 2019.

International career
Sissoko was capped for France at the 2008 Toulon Tournament.

Honours
Kilmarnock
Scottish League Cup: 2011–12

References

External links
 
 
 
 

1988 births
Living people
People from Villeneuve-la-Garenne
Footballers from Hauts-de-Seine
French footballers
France youth international footballers
Association football defenders
Paris FC players
Udinese Calcio players
Celano F.C. Marsica players
A.S.D. Gallipoli Football 1909 players
K.A.S. Eupen players
Kilmarnock F.C. players
Veria F.C. players
ASC Oțelul Galați players
FC Petrolul Ploiești players
Giresunspor footballers
Hapoel Acre F.C. players
Rovaniemen Palloseura players
Kardemir Karabükspor footballers
Scottish Premier League players
Liga I players
Super League Greece players
TFF First League players
Israeli Premier League players
Veikkausliiga players
French expatriate footballers
Expatriate footballers in Italy
Expatriate footballers in Belgium
Expatriate footballers in Scotland
Expatriate footballers in Romania
Expatriate footballers in Greece
Expatriate footballers in Turkey
Expatriate footballers in Israel
French expatriate sportspeople in Italy
French expatriate sportspeople in Belgium
French expatriate sportspeople in Scotland
French expatriate sportspeople in Romania
French expatriate sportspeople in Greece
French expatriate sportspeople in Turkey
French people of Malian descent